The 2021–22 Illinois State Redbirds women's basketball team represented Illinois State University during the 2021–22 NCAA Division I women's basketball season. The Redbirds, led by fifth-year head coach Kristen Gillespie, played their home games at the Redbird Arena as members of the Missouri Valley Conference.

They finished the season with a 19–14 overall record, 12–6 in conference play to finish in fourth place.  As the fourth seed in the Missouri Valley Tournament, they earned a bye into the Quarterfinals and defeated Loyola–Chicago, Southern Illinois, and Northern Iowa to win the championship.  They received an automatic bid to the NCAA tournament, where they were the fifteenth seed in the Greensboro Region.  They lost to second seed Iowa in the First Round to end their season.

Previous season
The Redbirds finished the season with a 16–9 overall record, 12–6 in Missouri Valley play to finish in third place.  As the third seed in the Missouri Valley Tournament, they earned a bye into the Quarterfinals where they lost to Loyola–Chicago.  They received an at-large bid to the WNIT, where they lost to Tulane in the First Round, defeated Samford in the Consolation Semifinal and lost to UT Martin in the Consolation Final.

Roster

Schedule

Source:

|-
!colspan=6 style=| Exhibition

|-
!colspan=6 style=| Non-Conference Regular season

|-
!colspan=6 style=| Missouri Valley Regular season

|-
!colspan=6 style=| Missouri Valley Tournament

|-
!colspan=6 style=| NCAA tournament

Rankings

The Coaches Poll did not release a Week 2 poll and the AP Poll did not release a poll after the NCAA Tournament.

References

Illinois State
Illinois State Redbirds women's basketball seasons
Illinois State women's
Illinois State women's
Illinois State